Handsome Pizza was a pizzeria in Portland, Oregon. Established in 2012, the business closed in August 2022.

Description
The pizzeria was located on Killingsworth Street in northeast Portland's Vernon neighborhood and shared a space with Seastar Bakery. Handsome's pizzas were "New York-Neapolitan hybrids" and featured sourdough crusts, baked in a custom-built, wood-fired oven.

History

Will Fain acquired the Pizza Depokos cart in 2011 and rebranded the business as Handsome Pizza in 2012. The restaurant operated from a garage in north Portland, until relocating to Killingsworth in August 2015. In 2020, 15 employees were laid off because of the COVID-19 pandemic.

In 2022, owners announced plans to close on August 14.

Reception
Michael Russell included Handsome Pizza in The Oregonian 2016 list of Portland's best new restaurants. The newspaper's Samantha Bakall included the pizzeria in a list of Portland's best wood-fired pizza. In 2018, Russell ranked Handsome Pizza number five in a list of Portland's top 10 pizzerias, and number six in a list of the city's best pizza by the slice. In 2021, Brooke Jackson-Glidden included Handsome Pizza in Eater Portland list of "Where to Find Exceptional Pizzas in Portland" and said the "hyper-seasonal specials are often stunners".

See also
 List of defunct restaurants of the United States
 Pizza in Portland, Oregon

References

External links

 
 

2012 establishments in Oregon
2022 disestablishments in Oregon
Defunct Italian restaurants in Portland, Oregon
Defunct pizzerias
Pizzerias in Portland, Oregon
Restaurants disestablished in 2022
Restaurants established in 2012
Vernon, Portland, Oregon